Argyrotaenia levidensa is a species of moth of the family Tortricidae. It is found in Brazil (Nova Teutonia).

References

Moths described in 1991
levidensa
Moths of South America